The 2001–02 season was the Fussball Club Basel 1893's 109th season in their existence and their 8th consecutive season in the Nationalliga A, the top flight of Swiss football. Basel played their home games in the newly constructed St. Jakob-Park complex. Club chairman was René C. Jäggi for the sixth consecutive season.

Overview

Off-season and pre-season
Christian Gross was the first team trainer for the third successive season. The club's main aim for the 2001–02 season was to win the Swiss Nationalliga A championship title. The second aim was to win the cup title. Their third aim was to stay in the 2001 UEFA Intertoto Cup as long as possible, if possible, win the final and thus to secure that the team advanced at least to the UEFA Cup.

New with profession contracts for the new season, Philipp Degen and Marco Streller were and brought up from the reserve team. Further, Pascal Zuberbühler returned from a one-year loan with Bayer Leverkusen. Basel's biggest signing for the new season were Scott Chipperfield, who came from Wollongong Wolves, and Christian Giménez, who was signed from Lugano. Further Marco Zwyssig transferred in from Tirol Innsbruck.

In the other direction, Iván Knez transferred out to Rapid Wien and Feliciano Magro returned to Udinese after his loan period ended. Further, André Muff was loaned out to Lugano and Jean-Michel Tchouga was loaned out to Lausanne-Sport. Marco Streller was loaned out to Concordia Basel.

On the 16 June FCB announced that Marcel Herzog had transferred to them from to Concordia Basel. On the 5 September the club announced that Miroslav König was loaned out to Concordia as countertrade. Then on 15 October this was reversed König returned to FCB and Herzog loaned back to Concordia.

Winter break
Soon after the winter break, in the second half of the season, Oliver Kreuzer retired from his active football career. Between the years 1997 and 2002 Kreuter played a total of 212 games for Basel scoring a total of 32 goals. 136 of these games were in the Nationalliga A, 9 in the Swiss Cup, 17 were in UEFA competitions (UEFA Cup and UIC) and 50 were friendly games. He scored 21 goals in the domestic league, 1 in the Cup, 3 in the European competitions and the other seven were scored during the test games.

Off-season
At the end of the season Massimo Ceccaroni retired from his professional career. Ceccaroni is still considered to be a cult figure in Basel. This not only because of his loyalty, having spent 25 years with the club, 10 years as youth player and 15 with their first team. But also, because he never scored a goal in the top flight of Swiss football. However, because he did not have many team appearances during the season, five in the league and six in the UIC, the club did not renew his contract and Ceccaroni's professional career came to an end. Between the years 1987 and 2002 Ceccaroni played a total of 605 games for Basel's first team scoring a total of six goals. 398 of these games were in the Nationalliga A and Nationalliga B, 34 in the Swiss Cup, 20 in the European competitions (UEFA cup and UIC) and 153 were friendly games. He scored four of his goals in the Nationalliga B and the other two were scored during the test games.

The Campaign

Friendly games
Basel started the season off with three warm-up matches. These were played against BSC Young Boys from the Nationalliga A , FC Thun and Yverdon-Sports from the Nationalliga B.

Domestic league 
The qualification round to the 2001–02 Nationalliga A was contested by twelve teams. The first eight teams of the regular season, or qualification round, then competed in the championship round. Three points were given for a victory and one for a draw. Each team took half of the points, rounded up to complete units, that were won in the qualification round into the second stage as bonus. The teams in the ninth to twelfth positions completed with the top four teams of the Nationalliga B in a Nationalliga A/B playoff round. 

The regular season started on 15 July and ended on 10 December. The championship play-offs began on 25 February 2001 and ended on 26 May. FCB’s aim for the teams was to end the qualification round in the tables top two or three and then in the championship round to win the title, or at least to reach third position which would qualify them for the 2001–02 UEFA Cup. 

 qualifying round
The season started in the worst possible way. In their first game away against FC Sion, Basel suffered a humiliating defeat. The home team were two goals up within half an hour and then on 38 minutes Hakan Yakin saw the red card for insulting the referee. In the second half Basel went completely under. First Julien Poueys scored a hattrick within 7 minutes (55, 59, 62) and then Samuel Ojong also scored a hattrick within 7 minutes (79, 81, 86). Basel were beaten 8–1. In the next game on 11 July 2001, a 3–1 home win in St. Jakob-Park against Servette, Marco Streller played his League debut being substituted in during the 66th Minute. Unfortunately for him, in the last minute of the game he headed in an own goal as he tried to clear a corner kick. It was to remain Streller's only game for Basel in this season, because he was loaned to feeder club FC Concordia Basel for the rest of the season. Christian Giménez was to play his debut on 18 July in the 3–3 draw with St. Gallen and his first goal for the club was to follow during the 3–1 home win against the Young Boys on the 11 August. Giménez was to end the qualifying round as the league’s top scorer with 19 goals in 20 appearances.

After five games Basel were straggling, they had achieved just one win and one draw, opposed to three defeats, with 7 to 15 goal tally. But hereafter, things turned for the better and they only suffered two further defeats up until the winter break. Despite the fact that these were against the reigning title holders Grasshopper Club, Basel ended the qualification as league leaders, five points ahead of Lugano and six ahead of the reigning champions.

Championship round
Basel started well into the second part of the season, winning their first four games, 5–2 away against second placed Lugano and 1–0, 2–0 and 4–0 at home against Zürich, Young Boys and Sion. In the fifth game they suffered another defeat against GC, but six straight wins followed, including their revenge 3–0 away victory against Sion and a revenge 4–1 victory against GC. During this period of the season FCB played their best football and pulled away at the top of the table and subsequently achieved the championship title prematurely. Despite the fact that they lost two of their last three games, they won their first title after 22 years of waiting. It was the ninth championship title in the club’s history.

Christian Giménez was the team’s top scorer with 26 goals over the entire season. Hakan Yakin had scored 13, George Koumantarakis scored 10 and Scott Chipperfield scored 6 goals.

Conclusion
Basel won the championship with 55 points, GC were vice-champions with 45 points and Lugano finished in third position. The club's aim in the championship title had been fully, and perhaps surprisingly, achieved. Both Lugano and Sion had reached the championship round, but both clubs did not obtain a 1st level license for the 2002/03 season and therefore both teams were relegated to the second tier.

Curiosity to the begin of Scott Chipperfield's career by FC Basel; Chipperfield signed his contract with the club and returned to Australia to pack his suitcases. As he boarded the plane to fly to his new employers, he knew that they would be playing their first game of the season during his time on the flight. When the plane landed in Switzerland the game was over and Basel had lost 1–8. The story goes that Chipperfield asked the driver who collected him, "who the heck have I signed for? The only reason I didn't fly straight back home, was because I knew you were waiting for me." At the end of the season Basel were number one and Sion were relegated. And the driver said to Chipperfield, "I'm sure glad that you knew that it was me, who was waiting to collect you at the airport."

Domestic Cup
Basel's clear aim for the Swiss Cup was to win the title, especially because the final was to be played in St. Jakob-Park. They had last won the trophy in 1975. Basel entered the competition in the round of 32 and were drawn away against local rivals Concordia Basel, who at that time played in the Nationalliga B. 

Concordia Basel (10 November 2001)
The game was played in the St. Jakob-Park with an attendance of 5,431 spectators. Concordia, the home team, started well into the game and had their first chance at goal on 5 minutes and their second chance another 5 minutes later. FCB started prudent and did not want to enter into risky situations. After they had won control of play, they started to dominate and had a couple of near misses. Then on 21 minutes Sébastien Barberis put the away team a goal up following a corner-kick. Concordia reacted immediately, with fighting spirit and came forward with tempo. Their first attack could only be stopped by a well-timed foul from FCB defender Alexandre Quennoz, who saw the yellow card. If he had waited a few seconds longer it might have been a penalty. FCB were always in danger of catching the equaliser, but despite doubling the lead on 41 minutes through a goal from George Koumantarakis, Concordia were dominating play. After the interval Concordia were still fighting, believing in their chance. On 59 minutes Christian Giménez added Basel’s third after a counter attack. From this moment on the game changed. Concordia had less and less stamina and their strengths were lost. Basel took control and dominated completely and on 75 minutes Hervé Tum added a fourth and on 90 minutes the last. FCB won 5–0 and advanced to the next round.

Colombier ( 17 February 2002)
In the round of 16 Basel were drawn with an away game against lower league team Colombier, who had that time played in 1. Liga Promotion, the third tier in the Swiss football pyramid. Colombier were playing good football and were top of their division at that time. At the end of the season, they were group champions, but missed promotion in the play-offs. The match was played in the New Year before the leagues had restarted after the winter break. This proved to be an advantage for Basel after their seven winter break friendlies. The team were well played in and won the game that they entirely dominated 1–0 through a goal from Giménez in the 56th minute.

Zürich (21 March 2002)
In the quarter-finals Basel were drawn away against Zürich. The match was played in the Letzigrund with an attendance of 6,800 spectators and came midst in the period as Basel were dominating in the league. Both teams started into the match with care, but FCB found quicker into their stride and soon had more possession. Therefore, it was no surprise that they took the lead through a goal from George Koumantarakis on 17 minutes. The home team reacted well, they sought after the equaliser and didn’t have to wait long, because Kanga Akalé netted on 24 minutes. The game was now level on possession until one minute before the break, as Ivan Ergic put the visitors back into the lead. After the interval play was again level, but the visitors did have an optical advantage. This became obvious as Akalé saw the yellow card for his second bookable foul and was dismissed. From this moment the game changed, the Zürich layers strength and stamina failed and Basel took control and dominated. On 85 minutes substitute Carlos Varela advanced down the right and put his team another goal up. Just two minutes later Basel’s other substitute Hervé Tum had a shot that hit the post and Scott Chipperfield converted the rebound to give Basel a comfortable 4–1 win.

Young Boys (11 April 2002)
In the semi-final Basel were drawn at home in the St. Jakob-Park against an out of form Young Boys, who had only picked up only one point in their last three league matches. Basel started better into the match, with good moves they created a number of chances. Alain Rochat stopped one of these with a foul inside the penalty area and was shown the yellow card by referee Massimo Busacca, but the spot kick from Murat Yakin rebounded from the post on 17 minutes. Basel came forwards, again created chances  and Christian Giménez converted one of these after 23 minutes to put the hosts one up. At the other end Gürkan Sermeter missed the equaliser as Basel keeper Pascal Zuberbühler saved his penalty kick. Basel remained in control of the game up until the interval. Although Carlos Varela had a shot on 49 minutes that hit the cross bar, the visitors started the second period with more determination and were rewarded on 51 minutes as Joel Descloux equalised for his team. The game became more aggressive and was an open slugfest. Amidst a number of bookings for over hard fouls, on 69 minutes Basel defender Philippe Cravero was shown the red card for a foul as last man and at the other end on 73 minutes YB keeper Paolo Collaviti was also dismissed for committing a foul as last man. The score remained 1–1 even after extra time, so a penalty shoot-out was required for the decision. In this Basel keeper Zuberbühler became major protagonist. Zuberbühler missed his own spot-kick as YB reserve keeper Adrian Lingenhag saved, but in return he himself saved three YB penalty attempts. Basel advanced to the final 

Grasshoppers (12 May 2002)
The final was played in the St. Jakob-Park with an attendance of 30,000 spectators and according to the draw the Grasshoppers were the home team. Basel started well into the game. GC were stopped in their forwards movement and Basel played a long ball in the opponent’s half towards Hervé Tum, who ran on and beat the advancing keeper Fabrice Borer from 12 metres. The match was played on level terms with chances on both sides. On 38 minutes Richard Núñez advanced on the right, turning on himself he played a long cross towards the far post, here Mladen Petrić ran clear and nodded in the equaliser. Two minutes before the break a goal from Basel’s captain Murat Yakin was disallowed because he had used his hand to control the ball. In the second period play remained level, again both teams created chances. However, neither keeper let a ball pass and so it came to extra time. In the 113th minute Scott Chipperfield played a high ball from the left, over GC goalie Borer, which Boris Smiljanic punched over the cross bar with his last effort, this because he assumed that Hervé Tum, who was positioned behind him, would nod the ball effortlessly into the goal. This opened the big stage for the Basel captain, Murat Yakin took a run-up and safely converted the penalty kick to win the final 2–1 and thus the Trophy.

Conclusion
From a FCB point of view, the club's cup aim to reach the final and win the trophy was achieved. Because the league championship title had mathematically and prematurely been decided, with this trophy Basel had achieved the domestic double.

UEFA Intertoto Cup
The UIC was divided into three groups with three finals, the winners of these finals advanced to the 2001–02 UEFA Cup. Basel’s clear aim for the competition was to reach the final and win it, to qualify to the UEFA Cup first round.

Second round, Grindavík
Basel were drawn against Iceland's Grindavík. They had qualified by beating Vilash Masallı 3–1 on aggregate in the first round. The first leg took place in the St. Jakob-Park in front of 6,843 fans. Basel won 3–0 and the goal scorers were Feliciano Magro in the 4th minute, Jean-Michel Tchouga in the 18th minute and Hervé Tum in the 60th.

The second leg was in Iceland, played in the Grindavíkurvöllur with an attendance of 700 spectators. Two goals from André Muff the first on 14 minutes and the second on 80 minutes gave Basel a 2–0 victory, thus 5–0 on aggregate.

Third round, Heerenveen
The next round saw Basel matched against SC Heerenveen, a Dutch club from the Eredivisie. Again, the first leg was played in the St. Jakob-Park, the attendance was 8,059 fans. Basel controlled the game from the beginning and took an early two goal lead through George Koumantarakis on 12 minutes and Hakan Yakin on 20 minutes. In the second period the visitors got into the game and on 56 minutes Mika Nurmela pulled a goal back. Basel overstood a hectic period and played down the time to win 2–1.

The second leg in Abe Lenstra Stadion had an attendance of 13,300 fans. Marcus Allbäck on 4 minutes gave SC Heerenveen an early lead. George Koumantarakis on 8 minutes and Hakan Yakin on 23 minutes turned the tables. In the second period Hervé Tum in the 69th minute put the visitors another goal up. The home team reduced the score line as Anthony Lurling netted in the 75th minute, but the home team could not catch up. The score remained 3–2 for Basel and they advanced with a 5–3 aggregate.

Semi-finals, Lausanne
The semi-final was an all-Swiss affair with their Nationalliga A rivals Lausanne-Sport. These had qualified to this stage beating UE Sant Julià from Andora twice with 9–1 aggregate in the first round and Sturm Graz, with an away win and a home draw, 4–3 on aggregate in the second round. The first leg in the St. Jakob-Park attracted an attendance of 14,872 spectators. Christian Giménez with a quick brace in the 19th and 21st minute put Basel two up. Just before the half time whistle Hakan Yakin added a third goal and in the second period they let the time tick-out to win comfortably 3–0.

The second leg in the Stade Olympique de la Pontaise only attracted 2,050 fans but they saw an interesting match in which Lausanne’s Pape Thiaw was the main character. First, he put the home team a goal up after 8 minutes. However, this was equalised ten minutes later by Hervé Tum. In the 30th minute Pape Thiaw committed a nasty foul and was booked for the offence by Ukrainian referee Vasyl Melnychuk. Then, following a set piece, just before the break Pape Thiaw put his team back into the lead. On 51 minutes he showed his nasty side again and for his second bookable offence he was dismissed. With one man more on the field FCB dominated play, but apart from the equaliser on 61 minutes through  Carlos Varela they could not take advantage of this fact. The game was drawn 2–2, but Basel won the tie 5–2 on aggregate.

Finals, Aston Villa
In the final Basel played against Aston Villa from the Premier League. Villa had finished in 8th position in the 2000–01 FA Premier League. They had qualified to the Final by beating NK Slaven Belupo 3–2 on aggregate in the third round and winning on away goals against Rennes in the semi-finals. Basel fancied their chances because their domestic had already played six rounds and the Premier League season had not started yet. The first leg of this final was played on 7 August 2001 in the St. Jakob-Park with an attendance of 25,879 fans.

Villa's reserve keeper Peter Enckelman played the match because Peter Schmeichel was injured and Enckelman was needed early as Basel made a bright start. Murat Yakin, who constantly troubled Villa full-back Mark Delaney, set up his younger brother Hakan with a very good chip over the defence. The striker advanced quickly to the area and left footed, shot powerfully, but the keeper dropped down well to save. About ten minutes later, Argentinian striker Gimenez beat Enckelman with a low, curling shot that glanced passed the right-hand post. Villa then found their way into the game and should have taken the lead on 25 minutes, but Mustapha Hadji missed the very good opportunity. There were few chances during the rest of the half, although Basle finished strongly, with the impressive Murat Yakin twice going close. The beginning of the second period was as evenly contested as the first, but on 59 minutes Villa’s captain Paul Merson scored their vital away goal, side-footing in from close range, after keeper Pascal Zuberbühler could only parry a hard shotHassan Kachloul. The hosts could have equalised with their next chance Jean-Michel Tchouga was unmarked inside the area, but his wild effort glanced over the crossbar. Basel did then restore parity on 74 minutes as substitute Carlos Varela ran forcefully into the area and following a powerful shot Enckelman could only parry and Gimenez side-footed the rebound home from close range. The game ended with this 1–1 draw.

The return leg was played on 21 August in Villa Park in Birmingham, which had an attendance of 39,513 spectators. Villa started well into the game and tried to create chances. Basel were happy to sit back and wait and stifle the Villa chances before they became dangerous. After quarter of an hour FCB switched up a gear and on the half an hour were rewarded for the attempt. Scott Chipperfield put the visitors a goal up, finishing off a good move from the right. Villa reacted and came forwards with tempo, they attempted to breach the visitors massive defence. This finally was successful in the 45th minute, Darius Vassell was the scorer. In the second half Basel seemed to lose control and Juan Pablo Ángel added Villa's second on 55 minutes. Basel fought back into the game and created dangerous chances, but it was the hosts who got the better as in the 78th minute Ángel added another. From here Basel were chanceless and David Ginola netted the fourth six minutes from the end. Villa won the match deservedly 4–1 and the tie 5–2 on aggregate.

Conclusion
Aston Villa's attendance of 39,513 versus Basel at Villa Park, represented the highest attendance for any Intertoto fixture that season. Basel achieved their absolute minimum aim for this competition, but their main aim had been missed, there would be no further European football for them this season.

Club

The Management

Other information

Players

First team squad

Out on loan

Transfers Summer 2001

In

Out

Transfers Winter 2001-02

In

Out

Results and fixtures

Friendlies

Pre-season and mid-season friendlies

Winter break and mid-season friendlies

Nationalliga A 2001–02

Qualification round
The Qualification Round to the League season 2002–03 was contested by twelve teams. The first eight teams of the regular season (or Qualification) were then to compete in the Championship Playoff Round. The teams in ninth to twelfth position completed with the top four teams of the Nationalliga B in a Nationalliga A/B Playoff round.

League table qualification

Championship Playoff Round
The first eight teams of the regular season (or Qualification) competed in the Championship Playoff Round. They took half of the points (rounded up to complete units) gained in the Qualification as Bonus with them.

League table championship
The first eight teams of the regular season (or Qualification) competed in the Championship Playoff Round. They took half of the points (rounded up to complete units) gained in the Qualification as Bonus with them.

Swiss Cup

UEFA Intertoto Cup

Second round

Basel won 5–0 on aggregate.

Third round

Basel won 5–3 on aggregate.

Semifinal

Basel won 5–2 on aggregate.

Final

Aston Villa won 5–2 on aggregate.

See also
 History of FC Basel
 List of FC Basel players
 List of FC Basel seasons

References

Sources
 Rotblau: Jahrbuch Saison 2015/2016. Publisher: FC Basel Marketing AG. 
 Rotblau: Jahrbuch Saison 2017/2018. Publisher: FC Basel Marketing AG. 
 Die ersten 125 Jahre / 2018. Publisher: Josef Zindel im Friedrich Reinhardt Verlag, Basel. 
 2001–02 at "Basler Fussballarchiv” homepage
 Switzerland 2001–02 at RSSSF

External links
 FC Basel official site

FC Basel seasons
Basel
2001-02